Camp Dunlap was a United States Marine Corps base in Imperial County, California. The camp was named for Brigadier General Robert H. Dunlap.  The 250,000 acre camp was used to train artillery and anti-aircraft units of the Fleet Marine Force.   The base was located at the present-day location of Slab City.

Construction of the camp was done by Vinson & Pringle and Del E. Webb Construction Company out of Phoenix, Arizona. The same company contracted to build Marine Corps Air Station El Centro and Marine Corps Air Station Mojave. Camp Dunlap opened on October 15, 1942 to serve as a training facility during World War II. The facility contained five different tent camps within its boundaries and eight different artillery ranges. During the war, the 10th, 11th, and 13th Marine Regiments trained there before departing overseas. The facility was also used as a bombing range for planes flying from nearby Marine Corps Air Station El Centro. The Marine Corps began dismantling the camp in December 1945 and finally closed it in March 1946. The base was turned over to the Naval Real Estate Board at that time. In October 1961, the United States Department of Defense conveyed the land on which Camp Dunlap was situated back to the State of California.

Notes

References
Bibliobraphy

United States Marine Corps bases
Closed installations of the United States Navy